Munshi Abdur Rouf (8 May 1943 – 8 April 1971) was a Lance Nayek in the East Pakistan Rifles during the Bangladesh Liberation War. He enlisted in the East Pakistan Rifles on 8 May 1963, and was attached with a regular infantry unit during the War of Liberation. Rouf died on 8 April 1971 at Burighat in Chittagong Hill Tracts after causing extensive damage to the Pakistani Army with his machine gun and forcing them to retreat. He was buried at Naniarchor Upazila in Rangamati District.

He was awarded Bir Sreshtho, which is the highest recognition of bravery in Bangladesh.

Early life
Munshi Abdur Rouf was born on 8 May 1943 at Salamatpur village (renamed Rouf Nagar) under Boalmari thana (currently Madhukhali thana) in Faridpur District. His father Munshi Mehedi Hossain was an "Imam" at a local mosque and his mother was Mukidunnesa. He had two sisters, their names were Zahura and Hazera. After his father's death in 1955, Rouf had to stop his education at the eighth grade. He joined the East Pakistan Rifles on 8 May 1963. He had to increase his age three years to get the job. After the preliminary training at the EPR camp at Chuadanga, Rouf went to West Pakistan to receive advanced training. He was appointed to Comilla after 6 months.

Death
The East Bengal Regiment wanted to restrict the Pakistani Army from using the Rangamati-Mahalchari waterway. Thus, they camped at both of the Chengi Lakes at Burighat. Rouf was serving as a soldier in this company. To prevent the Pakistani Army from using the Rangamati-Mahalchari waterway, the Regiment constructed a camp at both sides.

On 8 April 1971, the Pakistani Army attacked the Mukti Bahinis defensive position with 7 speed boats and 2 launches. Their mission was to drive the Mukti Bahini away from the waterway of Rangamati and Mohalchari. Pakistani forces managed to disorient Mukti Bahini by coming closer to them and firing heavily. In the meantime Pakistanis surrounded the freedom fighters and managed to isolate nearly 100 of them. Rouf realised the threat to the entire company. So, he crawled forward to his trench and continuously fired towards the enemies with his automatic machine gun. As a result, the Pakistanis dragged their launches back to a safer place and resumed firing from there. Suddenly a mortar hit Rouf directly and he was immediately killed. Rouf's valiant effort helped his company to survive as his act saved nearly 150 soldiers of the Mukti Bahini on that day.

Legacy
Bangladesh Rifles College was renamed Bir Shrestha Munshi Abdur Rouf Public College in Pilkhana in 2014. A monument for Rouf was built by Engineering Construction Battalion (ECB-16) at Shalbagan, midpoint of the Chittagong-Rangamati road, Sapchhari. A high school in Manikchari Muslim Para, Mahalchhari, Khagrachari has been named after him. A cricket stadium has been named in

Sylhet after him.
A college in Faridpur was named after him, which was nationalised by the Government.

Gallery

References

1943 births
1971 deaths
Bangladeshi military personnel
People killed in the Bangladesh Liberation War
Recipients of the Bir Sreshtho
Honorary Fellows of Bangla Academy
Mukti Bahini personnel